As Falls Wichita, So Falls Wichita Falls is a collaborative album by Pat Metheny and Lyle Mays, released in 1981. The title makes reference to Wichita, Kansas, and Wichita Falls, Texas. The title track is just under 21 minutes.

Throughout the album, Metheny acts as the lead guitarist, accompanying guitarist, and bassist using the overdubbing technique. The track "September Fifteenth" is in reference to September 15, 1980, the day the American jazz pianist Bill Evans died. Metheny and Mays cite Evans as a main influence. Both "September Fifteenth" and "It's for You" appear in the score for the 1985 film Fandango. "It's for You" was later covered by Akiko Yano, with Metheny on guitar, for her 1989 album, Welcome Back.

A section of the title track (starting at 14:56) has been used by Christian Dior for the Fahrenheit perfume and cologne ads since 1988.

Track listing

Personnel
 Pat Metheny – electric and acoustic 6- and 12-string guitars, bass guitar
 Lyle Mays – piano, Prophet 5 & Oberheim FVS synthesizers, electric organ, autoharp
 Naná Vasconcelos – berimbau, percussion, drums, vocals

Charts
Album – Billboard

References

Pat Metheny albums
1981 albums
Albums produced by Manfred Eicher
ECM Records albums